Satyameva Jayate is a 2018 Indian Hindi-language vigilante  action thriller film written and directed by Milap Milan Zaveri. Produced and distributed by T-Series, the film marks the second collaboration between Abraham and Bajpayee, after Shootout at Wadala (2013).

Principal photography for Satyameva Jayate began on 5 March 2018. It was released in global cinemas on 15 August 2018, coinciding with India's Independence Day. Opening on 2500 screens, the film received mixed reviews from critics and clashed with Reema Kagti's sports drama Gold starring Akshay Kumar. Nevertheless, Satyameva Jayate was well received by the audience and broke various opening day records for an A-rated film. The film was successful at the box office, and emerged as one of the highest-grossing Bollywood film of the year, grossing  worldwide. A sequel titled Satyameva Jayate 2 was released in 2021.

Premise
The story follows vigilante Virendra "Veer" Rathod, who kills corrupt police officers. Shivansh Rathod, an honest police officer is called to hunt Veer down after the body count begins to rise.

Plot

Veer is a painter and a vigilante who kills corrupt cops by setting them on fire. Without his identity revealed, he wins public support for wiping out the corrupt, and also forms a close relationship with a vet named Shikha. Worried by the rising body count and seeing other cops terrified, Commissioner Manish Shukla summons Shivansh, an honest officer, to hunt down the killer. Using a voice altering application, Veer calls Shivansh and threatens to kill a corrupt officer. Shivansh is tricked into believing a police station would be targeted, while Veer fights off and kills the targeted corrupt cop at a petrol pump. Realizing his mistake, Shivansh begins investigating further and discovers the killing pattern to be as per the acronym "Satyameva Jayate" and the next target to be from a station beginning with the letter Y. Shivansh and his team locate the station and begin surveillance as they wait for the killer. Disguised as a cop, Veer enters the police station and thrashes a corrupt cop torturing an innocent suspect. 

After he sets him on fire, Shivansh hears the screams and rushes to the station to find the cop burning. Veer manages to flee and later greets Shivansh at his home, where they both are revealed to be brothers. Veer and Shivansh visit a hospital where the burnt officer is found to be alive. Veer excuses himself to go to the bathroom and secretly enters the room, setting the officer on fire once again. Hearing the sirens go off, Shivansh rushes to the room and gets hit by an explosion as he opens the door. Veer returns to the bathroom, injures himself and pretends being attacked by the killer from behind. Later, Shivansh gathers all the corrupt policemen at a safe house, but Veer manages to burn it down and proceeds to take Shikha on a date, which gives him an alibi for a day. Later, Veer covers himself in blood and thrashes a corrupt officer during Ashura. He publicly kills him, following which Shivansh chases after him but finds himself held on gunpoint by Veer. Shivansh then explains how Veer's paintings of terrorized men, that resembled the murdered officers, revealed Veer to be the killer. Shivansh then asks Veer to turn himself in, but he declines and manages to flee.

Along with Commissioner Shukla, Shivansh is called by Veer at the same spot where their father died. Shikha, revealed to be Shukla's daughter, is in Veer's custody. Shivansh is shocked after Veer makes Shukla pour kerosene on himself and reveal he framed their father as he didn't allow anyone in the police force to bribe. Veer decides to turn himself in, before Shukla summons his army of cops to eliminate the brothers. In the ensuing fight, Veer leaves many cops dead, and Shukla cornered. After multiple requests to stop, a reluctant Shivansh ends up shooting Veer before he can kill Shukla. However, realizing the kerosene poured on Shukla's body is still fresh and finding a match lying near his father's medal that reads "Satyameva Jayate", a dying Veer lights it and kills Shukla by setting him on fire. Shivansh and Shikha then approach Veer, who asks Shivansh to recite with him the oath their father taught them. They recite it together, but in the middle, Veer dies in Shivansh's arms.

Cast 
 John Abraham as Veerendra "Veer" Rathore, Shivansh younger brother
 Manoj Bajpayee as Deputy Commissioner Of Police Officer Shivansh Rathore, Sarita Husband, Veer elder brother
 Aisha Sharma as Dr. Shikha Shukla, Veer's love interest
 Manish Chaudhari as Commissioner Manish Kumar Shukla, Shikha's father and the main antagonist
 Amruta Khanvilkar as Sarita Rathore, Shivansh Wife, Veer elder sister in law 
 Sandeep Yadav as Minister
 Devdatta Nage as Inspector Shankar Gaikwad
 Chetan Pandit as Inspector Shiv Rathod, Shivansh & Veer's father
 Ganesh Yadav as Inspector Damle
 Nora Fatehi in a special appearance in "Dilbar" song
 Aditi Sanwal as Girl in Car (cameo appearance)
 Rajesh Khera as Inspector Satish Bhosle

Release
The film was released on 15 August 2018 to coincide with Indian Independence Day. The film was released along with Akshay Kumar's Gold. It was released on 2500 screens in India.

Upon release the songs "Paniyon Sa" and "Tajdar E Haram" both became hits, whereas "Dilbar" became the blockbuster song of the year.

Soundtrack 

The music for the film is composed by Sajid–Wajid, Tanishk Bagchi, Rochak Kohli and Arko Pravo Mukherjee while lyrics are penned by Shabbir Ahmed, Kumaar, Arko Pravo Mukherjee, Danish Sabri and Ikka. The background score is composed by Sanjoy Chowdhury.

The first song of the film, "Dilbar" from the 1999 film Sirf Tum originally sung by Alka Yagnik and composed by Nadeem-Shravan has been recreated for this film by Tanishk Bagchi in the voices of Neha Kakkar, Dhvani Bhanushali and Ikka. It was released on 4 July 2018. Reinvisioned with Middle-Eastern musical influences, and with its music video featuring Nora Fatehi performing belly dancing, the song became popular with all versions of the song (including an Arabic-language version) having received more than 1billion views on YouTube.

The second song of the film titled as "Paniyon Sa," which is sung by Atif Aslam and Tulsi Kumar was released on 12 July 2018. The third song of the film to be released was "Tajdar-e-Haram", a Qawwali which was originally composed and sung by Sabri Brothers, is re – created and sung by Wajid Khan, on 26 July 2018. The fourth and the last song, "Tere Jaisa," sung by Arko Pravo Mukherjee and Tulsi Kumar, was released on 1 August 2018. The soundtrack was released by T-Series on 1 August 2018.

Box office

Satyameva Jayate earned 205.2 million net in India on its opening day, thus setting the records of the highest opening day collection for John Abraham and the fifth highest opener film of 2018 after Sanju, Race 3, Gold and Baaghi 2.

It grossed  at the overseas box office in its full run.

Satyameva Jayate worldwide gross stands at 1.08 billion

Sequel

A sequel has been confirmed with John Abraham and Divya Khosla Kumar playing lead roles. It will be directed by Milap Milan Zaveri and produced by Bhushan Kumar, Krishan Kumar, Monisha Advani, Madhu Bhojwani and Nikkhil Advani. Titled as Satyameva Jayate 2, it is scheduled to be released on 13 May 2021. As of April 2021, the release date of film has been postponed due to rise in COVID-19 cases. The film was finally released on 25 November 2021.

Critical reception
 Times of India
• On review aggregator Rotten Tomatoes, it holds a rating of 17%

References

External links 
 
 Satyameva Jayate at Bollywood Hungama

2018 films
2010s Hindi-language films
2018 action thriller films
2018 crime action films
2010s vigilante films
Indian action thriller films
Indian crime action films
Indian vigilante films
Films about corruption in India
Films about brothers
Indian police films
Films scored by Sajid–Wajid
Films directed by Milap Zaveri
2010s police films
Hindi-language action films